Honorable John Conyers, Jr., et al. v. George W. Bush, et al., No. 2:06-CV-11972, 2006 WL 3834224 (E.D. Mich. 2006), is a lawsuit in which Rep. John Conyers Jr. and others alleged that President George W. Bush violated the United States Constitution by signing a bill that was not passed by the United States Congress.

Nature of claim
John Conyers, a ranking member of the House Judiciary Committee, along with 10 other members of Congress, filed a lawsuit on April 28, 2006, at the district court in Detroit seeking a restraining order (injunctive relief) preventing the execution of the Deficit Reduction Act of 2005, S. 1932. The plaintiffs also sought a declaration that the bill be declared unconstitutional and not a valid law.

Parties

Plaintiffs
John Conyers
John Dingell 
George Miller 
Charles Rangel 
Collin Peterson 
Bennie Thompson 
Jim Oberstar 
Barney Frank 
Pete Stark 
Sherrod Brown 
Louise Slaughter

Defendants
George W. Bush
Agriculture Secretary Mike Johanns
Commerce Secretary Carlos Gutierrez
Education Secretary Margaret Spellings
Homeland Security Secretary Michael Chertoff
Housing Secretary Alphonso Jackson
Transportation Secretary Norman Y. Mineta 
Treasury Secretary John W. Snow

Outcome
The case was dismissed on November 6, 2006, by federal judge Nancy Garlock Edmunds in Detroit, who cited the representatives' lack of standing to bring this suit.

See also
Jim Zeigler
Presentment Clause

References

George W. Bush administration controversies
Bicameralism and Presentment case law